Comdirect Bank Aktiengesellschaft was the third-largest German direct bank and was based in Quickborn, Schleswig-Holstein. Founded by the Commerzbank in 1994, the company went public in 2000. The Commerzbank integrated the company on November 1, 2020.

History

Foundation 
In 1994, the Commerzbank desired to expand its business and customer base and therefore decided to establish a direct bank.  Commerzbank founded Comdirect, which was registered in December 1994 as a private limited company (GmbH - Gesellschaft mit beschränkter Haftung). It began operations with 50 employees and 50 million Deutsche Mark on equity in January 1995. The company positioned itself not as a traditional direct bank like seen before, but instead as a universal bank for private customers with a wide range of specialized products. One of the first products of the Comdirect Bank was a money market account. Also, securities trading became one of the top priorities.

Public offering 
Within the first few months, the Comdirect Bank gained tens of thousands of customers. In the late 1990s, the Comdirect Bank expanded to other European countries. The Commerzbank and Deutsche Telekom agreed on the cooperation of their subsidiaries, the Comdirect Bank and T-Online International. Comdirect Bank became a public company (Aktiengesellschaft) in November 1999 and went public in June 2000. Commerzbank sold a minority stake in the company. The stock was oversubscribed several times and later became part of the Nemax 50 index and the Prime Standard of Frankfurt Stock Exchange. The proceeds of the initial public offering were used to build the investment banking of the Comdirect Bank, for example. The company doubled its workforce to cope with the growing number of customers.

Consolidation 
In 2000, the burst of the dot-com bubble hit the financial industry. The Comdirect Bank was also affected and as a result, growth slowed. After several successful years, the bank announced losses in 2001. As the Comdirect Bank slipped into financial difficulties, the board launched a savings program. At the end of 2001, the Comdirect Bank announced to focus on Germany and the United Kingdom. The company places its loss-making branches at disposal; the subsidiaries in France and Italy were sold and closed. Finally, in 2004, the Comdirect Bank sold its British subsidiary, too.

From then on, the Comdirect Bank exclusively focused on its home market in Germany. The company accelerated the expansion of its product range and, in particular, cared more about customer advisory services. The new strategy stabilized the business. The first dividend was distributed in 2004 and in 2005, the German retail banking of American Express was acquired, which helped to grow the customer base significantly.

To profit more from the performance of the Comdirect Bank, the Commerzbank increased its investment to almost 80% in June 2005. The group purchased the remaining share from T-Online International.

Acquisitions 
Even during the global financial crisis from 2007, the business remained stable; the Comdirect Bank profited from the increase in transactions in securities trading.

In 2009, the Comdirect Bank acquired the European Bank for Financial Services (ebase) from the Commerzbank, doubling the number of managed securities accounts. At the same time, the bank extended its position in financial services and asset management. During the following years, the Comdirect Bank repositioned the European Bank for Financial Services as a business-to-business bank. In July 2018, comdirect agreed to sell ebase to London-based financial technology provider FNZ Group to focus more on the core business and completed the sale in July 2019.

In 2016, the Comdirect Bank announced the acquisition of the Onvista Group. Both the Onvista Bank and Onvista Media, operator of a high-reach financial portal, became part of the Comdirect Bank. With this investment, the Comdirect Bank strengthened securities trading and financial information business at the same time. While the Onvista Bank merged with the Comdirect Bank, Onvista Media continued operations as a subsidiary.

Digitalization 
In recent years, the Comdirect Bank invested heavily in digital technologies. For example, the company published the first online banking app with support for accounts from other institutions. It launched the "startup garage" for financial technology startups. The company was the first bank in Germany to publish an Amazon Alexa skill, for example, and later added support for Google Home. The Comdirect Bank also launched a robo-advisor named Cominvest.

In late 2019, Commerzbank entered into talks with Petrus Advisers to buy its 7.5% stake in Comdirect and take over the entire online bank.

Structure 
Onvista Media is a subsidiary of Comdirect bank in Germany.

Products 
comdirect bank offers current accounts, online brokerage and several types of credits and loans.

Responsibility 
In 2009, the Comdirect Bank and the Stuttgart Stock Exchange founded the Stiftung Rechnen, a non-profit foundation with a registered office in Hamburg and headquarters in Quickborn. Its primary goal is to support knowledge of mathematics with a focus on young peogle to encourage a joy of numbers and calculation. Johanna Wanka, former Federal Minister of Education and Research, is the patron of the Stiftung Rechnen; Christian Rach, a star-rated chef and author, is one of its prominent ambassadors.

Controversies 
The Comdirect Bank accidentally reported 200 million euros to an account of a customer in 2012. The bank justified the error with a technical problem on the sale of funds, which could not be seen before. After the reversal, there was a negative balance, which caused lending rates that the Comdirect Bank had to reimburse.

In 2016, a breakdown occurred after a software update: A small number of customers of the Comdirect Bank were able to view account balances of other customers for a very short time. However, third parties were not able to do wire transfers. Though there was no financial or material damage, the company regretted the mistake, apologized to all affected customers and informed them about the extent of third-party access.

Since 2017, the bank is being targeted by activist investor Petrus Advisers. The investor is questioning the cost structure (cost-income-ratio is over 70%), the governance and incentive structure, and the management quality among others.

References

External links 

 
 

Banks established in 1994
Banks of Germany
Companies based in Schleswig-Holstein
Companies formerly listed on the Frankfurt Stock Exchange
German brands
1994 establishments in Germany
Commerzbank